Volume Six or Volume VI or Volume 6 may refer to:

Hangover Music Vol. VI
Radio 1's Live Lounge – Volume 6
Volume 6: Black Anvil Ego
Warts and All: Volume 6
Anjunabeats Volume Six

See also

Volume Zero (disambiguation)
Volume One (disambiguation)
Volume Two (disambiguation)
Volume Three (disambiguation)
Volume Four (disambiguation)
Volume Five (disambiguation)
Volume Seven (disambiguation)
Volume Eight (disambiguation)
Volume Nine (disambiguation)
Volume Ten (disambiguation)